The Kansai Ki-In Championship is a Go competition.

Outline
The original Kansai Ki-In Championship ran from 1957 to 1975. It was merged with the Nihon Ki-In Championship to form the Tengen. A new Kansai Ki-In Championship tournament replaced the old. The tournament is sponsored by Sanyo Shimbun.

Past winners

Go competitions in Japan